Tevir (Hebrew: , with variant English spellings including T'vir and Tebir) is a cantillation mark commonly found in the Torah, Haftarah, and other Hebrew biblical books. It can be found independently or it can follow any number of other cantillation marks, very commonly a Mercha or Darga.

The Hebrew word תְּבִ֛יר translates into English as broken.

Total occurrences

Melody
The Tevir is sung on a low tone, going downward at the beginning and upward at the end.

References

Cantillation marks